Hog Island Shoal Light, built in 1901, is a sparkplug lighthouse on a shoal off of Hog Island, Rhode Island. It was built to replace a light ship, and was the last light station formally established in the state. The lighthouse was automated in 1964. In 1988 it was added to the National Register of Historic Places. In 2006 the lighthouse was auctioned by the GSA as government surplus to a private buyer.

See also 
 National Register of Historic Places listings in Newport County, Rhode Island

References

Lighthouses in Newport County, Rhode Island
Narragansett Bay
Lighthouses completed in 1901
Lighthouses on the National Register of Historic Places in Rhode Island
National Register of Historic Places in Newport County, Rhode Island
1901 establishments in Rhode Island